WDGY (740 kHz) is a commercial AM radio station licensed to Hudson, Wisconsin, and serving the Minneapolis-St. Paul radio market.  It is owned by WRPX, inc. and airs a Classic Hits/Oldies radio format.  The station's studios and offices are in Lakeland, Minnesota, while its transmitter is off Commerce Drive near Interstate 94 in Hudson. This station is unrelated to the original WDGY, which was a popular top-40 station in the area during the 1950s, '60s and '70s.

Because AM 740 is a Canadian clear channel frequency, WDGY is a daytime-only station.  It must sign-off as sunset to prevent interfering with Class A CFZM in Toronto.  WDGY can be heard around the clock on two FM translator stations:  92.1 W221BS from St. Paul and 103.7 W279DD from Hudson.  The station can also be heard on 107.1 KTMY's HD2 channel in the Twin Cities.

History

The original WDGY

WDGY was founded in 1923 by Dr. George Young, an optometrist who dabbled in radio as a hobby, and was one of the first commercial radio stations in the Twin Cities area. The original call sign was KFMT, broadcasting at 1300 kHz. The following year, the station moved to 1140 kHz. After several call letter changes, including WHAT and WGWY, Young settled on WDGY, which was based on his initials. The WDGY call letters lasted from 1925 until 1991, first at 1140 kHz, then to its longtime home at 1130 kHz beginning in 1941. Following Young's death in 1945, his estate sold the station.

WDGY went through several ownership changes until 1956, when it were purchased by Todd Storz' Storz Broadcasting, an Omaha-based owner of a five-to-seven-station group (the maximum number allowed in those days). Storz quickly changed the format to Top 40, taking advantage of the early rise of rock and roll music. The station was nicknamed "WeeGee," the phonetic pronunciation of the call sign, and its format was near the top of the ratings for several years.

In 1959, WDGY gained a formidable challenger when KDWB launched. The two competitors seesawed back and forth in ratings supremacy for area teen and young adult audiences throughout the 1960s and '70s. The competition, sometimes friendly, sometimes not, resulted in memorable merchandising promotions and concerts. 

Generally, WDGY came in second in overall audience ratings to market-dominant, clear-channel WCCO. WDGY seemed to appeal to 18- to 35-year-old listeners while KDWB held a fair share of the teen audiences - considered hot properties during this period.

WDGY's longtime Top 40 format came to an end at 3 pm, September 2, 1977. Faced with much stronger competition on the FM dial, WDGY adopted a country music format, which continued well into the 1980s. Later WDGY would flip to a news/talk format; and finally, the adoption of sports talk as KFAN in 1991. Ironically, the abandoned WDGY call letters were quickly picked up by the former rival station at 630 kHz.

History of 740 AM
The original call sign for the station's construction permit was WAOZ, but the station was never on the air with those call letters. 740 AM began broadcasting as WRPX, featuring a locally based MOR/adult contemporary format targeting the Hudson/St. Croix Valley area on December 14, 1983.

After a brief shutdown in 1993 due to business failure and the sale of WRPX, the station picked up the vacated WMIN call sign, which had a long history in the market. WMIN aired a pop music Spanish-language format as "La Nueva Ley" until November 14, 2005.  It also aired sports talk at various times as well as leasing time to two groups that eventually purchased their own full-time frequencies: "Straight Talk Radio" (later on 950 KTNF) and "Relevant Radio" (later on 1330 WLOL).

In 2008, the station became WDGY after sister station 630 AM switched to Regional Mexican music, using the call letters WREY.

The WMIN call sign was used from 1936 until 1972 by the predecessor to today's 1400 KMNV, and the call sign was also briefly used for a shared-time television station on channel 11.

In 2014, the station began broadcasting in HD.

In May 2016, WDGY began simulcasting on FM translator W279DD 103.7 in Hudson, Wisconsin.  In February 2017, WDGY added another FM translator, W221BS 92.1, broadcasting from an antenna atop Wells Fargo Place in Downtown St. Paul.

On March 7, 2017, WDGY discontinued broadcasting in HD and began broadcasting in C-QUAM AM stereo. Due to the re-heightened awareness of HD broadcasting on AM surrounding the October 27, 2020 FCC vote to approve voluntary all-digital broadcasting by AM stations, WDGY resumed an HD Radio signal on November 17, 2020. WDGY is the only AM radio station in the Minneapolis-St. Paul market that broadcasts in HD. 

On October 30, 2021, WDGY once again discontinued broadcasting in HD Radio. Unlike in 2017, C-QUAM AM stereo did not return.

In February 2022, the station resumed broadcasting in AM HD.

WDGY at one time carried "The True Oldies Channel" programmed by New York City DJ Scott Shannon.  It now programs its oldies format along with local hosts in-house.

References

External links

Radiotapes.com Historic Minneapolis/St. Paul airchecks dating back to 1924 including WDGY and other Twin Cities radio stations
Rick Burnett's Twin Cities Radio Airchecks.Com features many 1970s' radio airchecks, including the old original WDGY.  There are also old photos of the WDGY studios in Bloomington, Minnesota.]
Oldiesloon.com, featuring information about former Twin Cities Top 40 stations

DGY
Classic hits radio stations in the United States
Radio stations established in 1983
1983 establishments in Wisconsin
DGY